Prateek Jain (born 10 October 1994) is an Indian cricketer. He made his first-class debut for Karnataka in the 2018–19 Ranji Trophy on 14 December 2018. He made his List A debut on 25 October 2019, for Karnataka in the final of the 2019–20 Vijay Hazare Trophy. He made his Twenty20 debut on 9 November 2019, for Karnataka in the 2019–20 Syed Mushtaq Ali Trophy.

References

External links
 

1994 births
Living people
Indian cricketers
Karnataka cricketers
Place of birth missing (living people)